FastICA is an efficient and popular algorithm for independent component analysis invented by Aapo Hyvärinen at Helsinki University of Technology. Like most ICA algorithms, FastICA seeks an orthogonal rotation of prewhitened data, through a fixed-point iteration scheme, that maximizes a measure of non-Gaussianity of the rotated components. Non-gaussianity serves as a proxy for statistical independence, which is a very strong condition and requires infinite data to verify. FastICA can also be alternatively derived as an approximative Newton iteration.

Algorithm

Prewhitening the data 
Let the  denote the input data matrix,  the number of columns corresponding with the number of samples of mixed signals and  the number of rows corresponding with the number of independent source signals. The input data matrix  must be prewhitened, or centered and whitened, before applying the FastICA algorithm to it.

Centering the data entails demeaning each component of the input data , that is,
 

The whitened data matrix is defined thus by

Single component extraction 

The iterative algorithm finds the direction for the weight vector 
that maximizes a measure of non-Gaussianity of the projection , 
with  denoting a prewhitened data matrix as described above.
Note that  is a column vector. To measure non-Gaussianity, FastICA relies on a nonquadratic nonlinear function , its first derivative , and its second derivative . Hyvärinen states that the functions 

are useful for general purposes, while 
 
may be highly robust. The steps for extracting the weight vector  for single component in FastICA are the following: 
 Randomize the initial weight vector 
 Let , where  means averaging over all column-vectors of matrix 
 Let 
 If not converged, go back to 2

Multiple component extraction 

The single unit iterative algorithm estimates only one weight vector which extracts a single component. Estimating additional components that are mutually "independent" requires repeating the algorithm to obtain linearly independent projection vectors - note that the notion of  independence here refers to maximizing non-Gaussianity in the estimated components. Hyvärinen provides several ways of extracting multiple components with the simplest being the following. Here,  is a column vector of 1's of dimension .

Algorithm FastICA
Input:  Number of desired components
Input:  Prewhitened matrix, where each column represents an -dimensional sample, where 
Output:  Un-mixing matrix where each column projects  onto independent component. 
Output:  Independent components matrix, with  columns representing a sample with   dimensions.
 
  for p in 1 to C:
      Random vector of length N
     while  changes
         
         
         
  output 
  output

See also 

 Unsupervised learning
 Machine learning
 The IT++ library features a FastICA implementation in C++
 Infomax

References

External links
 FastICA in Python
 FastICA package for Matlab or Octave
 fastICA package in R programming language
 FastICA in Java on SourceForge
 FastICA in Java in RapidMiner.
 FastICA in Matlab
 FastICA in MDP
Factor analysis
Computational statistics
Machine learning algorithms